Madeleine (Hsu) Forte (born 20 September 1938) is a Franco-American pianist, recording artist, and Professor Emerita of Piano at the Morrison Center for the Performing Arts at Boise State University.

Early life and education
Madeleine Forte began her career at a Beethoven festival in Vichy, France. She first studied piano with her aunt, then with master pianists Alfred Cortot and Wilhelm Kempff. She has won prizes in international competitions (Viotti, Italy; Maria Canals, Spain; Guanabara, Brazil).
She holds a Musicology Diploma from the École Normale de Musique de Paris in the class of Norbert Dufourcq, Artist Diplomas from the Ecole Normale and the Warsaw Conservatory in the class of Zbigniew Drzewiecki, and bachelor's and master's degrees from The Juilliard School, where she studied with Rosina Lhévinne and Martin Canin. In 1970, she received the "Josef Lhevinne Memorial Award" in New York that granted a full scholarship to complete her master's at Juilliard. She became a United States immigrant and an American Citizen in January 1976. In 1996 she was a Yale University Visiting Hendon Fellow. In 1984 she received the Ph.D. degree from New York University with a dissertation on the music of Olivier Messiaen. She is a recipient of the Master Teacher Certificate, Music Teachers National Association. The Madeleine Hsu Forte Piano scholarship is offered on a yearly basis to a gifted piano student at Boise State University.

Recording and performing
Madeleine Forte has appeared as a recording artist on Radiodiffusion-television française in Paris, on Radio Warsaw, on Television O Globo, Rio-de-Janeiro, Radio Television Buenos Aires, and NBC Television, New York. Her compact disc recordings of the music of Albéniz, Arensky, Barber, Bartók, Beethoven, Bizet, Busoni Chabrier, Chopin, Debussy, Falla, Glière, Khachaturian, Liszt, Manuel Infante, Messiaen, Poulenc, Rachmaninoff, Ravel, and Saint-Saëns are distributed worldwide. She has presented solo recitals and has performed as a soloist with orchestras in France, Italy, Spain, Switzerland, Belgium, Poland, Estonia, Hungary, Brazil, Argentina, Uruguay, Austria, England, Norway, the United States, Canada, China, Japan, and South Korea. She is a founding member of The Bel-Être Ensemble and the Lillibridge Ensemble.

Personal life
Forte is the widow of Allen Forte, American music theorist and musicologist. She has two sons Yann and Olen, and two grandchildren Olivier Guillaume and Elodie Marie.

Discography

References

External links
Madeleine Forte's website

1938 births
20th-century French women classical pianists
Living people
21st-century classical pianists
American women classical pianists
American classical pianists
21st-century American women